= Chopda Kalan =

- village
- Location within Madhya Pradesh Location within India
- Coordinates: 23.319959°N 77.4572897°E
- Country: India
- State: Madhya Pradesh
- District: Bhopal
- Tehsil: Huzur
- Elevation: 494 m (1,621 ft)

Population (2011)
  - Total: 1,937
- Time zone: UTC+5:30 (IST)
- ISO 3166 code: MP-IN
- 2011 census code: 482427

Chopda Kalan is a village in the Bhopal district of Madhya Pradesh, India. It is located in the Huzur tehsil and the Phanda block.

== Demographics ==
According to the 2011 census of India, Chopda Kalan has 402 households. The effective literacy rate (i.e. the literacy rate of population excluding children aged 6 and below) is 71.31%.

Demographics (2011 Census)
	Total	Male	Female
Population	1937	1017	920
Children aged below 6 years	330	180	150
Scheduled caste	319	160	159
Scheduled tribe	55	28	27
Literates	1146	693	453
Workers (all)	739	501	238
Main workers (total)	598	439	159
Main workers: Cultivators	124	98	26
Main workers: Agricultural labourers	246	147	99
Main workers: Household industry workers	27	17	10
Main workers: Other	201	177	24
Marginal workers (total)	141	62	79
Marginal workers: Cultivators	10	7	3
Marginal workers: Agricultural labourers	85	18	67
Marginal workers: Household industry workers	5	2	3
Marginal workers: Others	41	35	6
Non-workers	1198	516	682
